Clangers and Mash is an EP by British singer-songwriter Gwyneth Herbert. It was released on 1 November 2010 and was critically acclaimed, receiving a four-starred review from The Guardian.

The EP includes remixes, by Seb Rochford of Polar Bear, of some of Gwyneth Herbert's previously published songs as well as the song "Perfect Fit" which had been issued as a free download in October 2009 and was released as a single on 7 March 2011.

Reception
In a four-starred review for The Guardian, jazz critic John Fordham described it as a "fascinating set of variations on the familiar for Herbert regulars, or an appealing introduction for jazz-averse newcomers", saying that although her songs had been radically transformed, "Herbert's unfussy soulfulness and personal vision always glow through".

John Eyles, in a review for BBC Music, described the "fragility of Herbert's performance" on the closing track, an a cappella version of  "Midnight Oil", as "beautiful".

Ivan Hewett, writing for The Daily Telegraph, said that the song "Perfect Fit" "has such a guilessly catchy melody you can't help being charmed by it."

Track listing

References

External links
Gwyneth Herbert: official website

2010 EPs
Gwyneth Herbert albums
Remix albums by British artists
Remix EPs